A McKendree cylinder is a type of hypothetical rotating space habitat originally proposed at NASA's Turning Goals into Reality conference in 2000 by NASA engineer Tom McKendree. Like other space habitat designs, the cylinder would spin to produce artificial gravity by way of centrifugal force. The design differs from the classical designs produced in the 1970s by Gerard K. O'Neill and NASA in that it would use carbon nanotubes instead of steel, allowing the habitat to be built much larger.

As originally proposed, the McKendree cylinder is simply a scaled-up version of the O'Neill cylinder. Like the O'Neill cylinder, McKendree proposed dedicating half of the surface of the colony to windows, allowing direct illumination of the interior. The habitat would be composed of a pair of counter-rotating cylinders which would function like momentum wheels to control the habitat's orientation.

McKendree cylinders in fiction

McKendree Cylinders are a type of habitat in the fictional universe of the Orion's Arm world-building project, but scaled up to the theoretical limits of carbon nanotubes: 1000 km in radius and 10,000 km long, containing  of living space — greater than the continent of Eurasia.

References

External links

Carbon nanotubes
Megastructures
Space colonization
Space habitats